The 2008 season of the Toppserien, the highest women's football (soccer) league in Norway, began on 12 April 2008 and ended on 2 November 2008.

22 games were played with 3 points given for wins and 1 for draws. Number eleven and twelve were relegated, while the two top teams from the First Division were promoted.

Røa won the league, defending their title. Asker went defunct after the season, but relocated their team to Stabæk.

League table

Results

Top goalscorers

Promotion and relegation
 Larvik and Fart were relegated to the First Division.
 Sandviken and Fortuna Ålesund were promoted from the First Division.

References

External links
League table
Fixtures

Toppserien seasons
Top level Norwegian women's football league seasons
1
Norway
Norway